Dragon Age: Redemption is a six-part webseries based on the Dragon Age video game series developed by BioWare. It was created by and stars Felicia Day, creator and star of the webseries The Guild. Day plays Tallis, an Elven assassin. Filming began in early January 2011 and Day enlisted the help of many prior Hollywood acquaintances.

The web series premiered on October 10, 2011, as a tie-in to the Dragon Age II DLC pack Mark Of The Assassin which was released on October 11, 2011.

Cast
 Felicia Day as Tallis
 Adam Rayner as Cairn
 Doug Jones as Saarebas
 Marcia Battise as Nyree
 Masam Holden as Josmael

Plot

List of episodes

Reception
S. Jim Browski of movie review website AintItCoolNews.com writes:

SteveGarbage of GreyWardens.com also reviewed the series favorably.

References

Dragon Age
Fantasy web series
American drama web series
Works about video games
Works based on Electronic Arts video games